Burning Bush is a 2013 three-part miniseries created for HBO by Polish director Agnieszka Holland. Based on real characters and events, this haunting drama focuses on the personal sacrifice of a Prague history student, Jan Palach, who set himself on fire in 1969 in protest against the Soviet occupation of Czechoslovakia in the previous year. Dagmar Burešová, a young female lawyer, became part of his legacy by defending Palach's family in a trial against the communist government, a regime which tried to dishonour Palach’s sacrifice, a heroic action for the freedom of Czechoslovakia.

The fight for freedom, for moral principles, self-sacrifice and protest in those desperate times led to the moral unification of a repressed nation, which twenty years later defeated the totalitarian regime. The anniversary of Jan Palach’s death inspired a new generation of students to start protests that led to the eventual fall of communism in Czechoslovakia, part of the eventual destruction of the Iron Curtain.

Lawyer Dagmar Burešová, who spent her life representing dissident opposition leaders, became the first Minister of Justice in a free Czechoslovakia.

The film is dedicated to Jan Palach, Jan Zajíc, Evžen Plocek, Ryszard Siwiec and to all who sacrificed their lives while fighting for freedom.

At the International TV Festival in Monte Carlo, Ivan Trojan was awarded the prize of Golden Nymph for the Best Actor in a mini-series. It has been selected to be screened in the Special Presentation section at the 2013 Toronto International Film Festival.

The series was later edited into a film. The premiere of the film version was set to be on 12 September 2013. The film was originally selected as the Czech entry for the Best Foreign Language Film at the 86th Academy Awards. However AMPAS disqualified the film, citing regulations that the film must not have initially appeared on television. The mini-series aired on Czech TV eight months prior to the re-edited version that appeared in cinemas.

Cast 
Tatiana Pauhofová as JUDr. Dagmar Burešová, a lawyer of the Palach family
Jaroslava Pokorná as Libuše Palachová, Jan Palach's mother
Petr Stach as Jiří Palach, Palach's brother
Ivan Trojan as Major Jireš, Public security (police) officer who investigates Palach's death (fictional character)
Igor Bareš as Major Dočekal, secret police StB ("state secret security") (fictional character)
Vojtěch Kotek as Ondřej Trávníček, a student activist (composite character)
Jan Budař as Radim Bureš, Burešová's husband
Adrian Jastraban as Vladimír Charouz, Burešová's superior
Patrik Děrgel as Pavel Janda
Denny Ratajský as Lieutenant Boček, Jireš's workmate
Tomáš Dianiška as Mlíko
Jenovéfa Boková as Vlaďka Charouzová, Charouz's daughter
Ivana Uhlířová as Judge Orlová
Stanislav Zindulka as JUDr. Sládeček, lawyer, colleague of Burešová
Ondřej Malý as JUDr. Knapp, lawyer, colleague of Burešová
Martin Huba as Vilém Nový, a communist official who defames Palach
Míša Procházková as Zuzanka Burešová, Burešová's daughter
Tereza Korejsová as Lucinka Burešová, Burešová's daughter
Alois Švehlík as Colonel Horyna, high-ranking Public security commander, superior of Jireš and Dočekal
Hana Marie Maroušková as Ilona Palachová, Jiří Palach's wife
Miroslav Krobot as conductor Jiřička
Emma Smetana as Hana Čížková
Taťjana Medvecká as MUDr. Jana Ziková, a doctor who treats Palach at the hospital
Pavel Cisovský as comrade Hazura

References

External links
 
 
 
 
 

2013 television films
2013 films
2013 Czech television series debuts
Czech drama films
Films directed by Agnieszka Holland
Czech Lion Awards winners (films)
Warsaw Pact invasion of Czechoslovakia
Czech Film Critics' Awards winners
HBO Europe original programming
Czech-language HBO original programming
Czech films based on actual events